Benjamin Lewis Wilmot (born 4 November 1999) is an English professional footballer who plays for Championship club Stoke City. He primarily plays in central defence, though he can also be deployed in midfield.

Wilmot began his career at Stevenage in the club's academy before breaking through into the first-team during the 2017–18 season. He subsequently signed for Watford in May 2018. Wilmot was loaned out to Serie A club Udinese in January 2019, before later joining Swansea City of the Championship on loan in July 2019. He returned to Watford and helped the club earn promotion to the Premier League during the 2020–21 season. Wilmot then signed for Stoke City in June 2021. He has also represented England at under-19, under-20 and under-21 level.

Early life
Born in Stevenage, Hertfordshire, he is the son of former Stevenage goalkeeper Richard Wilmot, who made over 150 appearances for the club. Wilmot attended Hitchin Boys' School and played in the youth teams at Hitchin Town.

Club career

Stevenage
Wilmot joined Stevenage as an academy scholar, and progressed through the youth academy at his hometown club. As a first-year scholar, he signed his first professional contract with the club in April 2017, having played regularly throughout Stevenage's FA Youth Cup run during the 2016–17 season.

He made his first-team debut on 3 October 2017, playing the whole match in the centre of defence as Stevenage drew 0–0 away at Milton Keynes Dons in the EFL Trophy. He established himself as a first-team regular throughout January 2018, helping the club keep three clean sheets in six matches. Stevenage chairman Phil Wallace stated the club had rejected three bids from Premier League clubs for Wilmot during the 2018 January transfer window, which included a £500,000 bid from Watford, whilst Tottenham Hotspur offered "slightly less". Wilmot was not included in any of Stevenage's matches from the start of April 2018 until the remainder of the season with a transfer "close" to being agreed. He made 15 appearances during the season.

Watford
Wilmot signed for Premier League club Watford on 24 May 2018, for an undisclosed fee and on a five-year contract. Stevenage stated that the fee was a record transfer fee received by the club and that it could rise significantly based on Wilmot's future appearances. Wilmot made his first-team debut for Watford in the club's EFL Cup tie away at Reading on 29 August 2018, starting and playing the whole match in a 2–0 win.

Loan spells
Wilmot joined Serie A club Udinese on loan on 31 January 2019 for the remainder of the 2018–19 season. He made his Udinese debut in the club's 4–1 defeat away to Juventus on 8 March 2019, playing the first half of the match. Wilmot made five appearances for Udinese during the loan spell.

Ahead of the 2019–20 season, on 25 July 2019, Wilmot joined Championship club Swansea City on a season-long loan deal. He made his Swansea debut in the club's 3–1 home victory over Northampton Town in the EFL Cup on 13 August 2019, playing the whole match. Wilmot made just two appearances in the opening two months of the season, eventually making his Championship debut as an late substitute in a 2–1 away win at Charlton Athletic on 2 October 2019. He scored his first goal for the club in the South Wales derby; his first-half header proved decisive in an eventual 1–0 victory on 27 October 2019. Wilmot sustained a knee injury in Swansea's 1–1 draw with Millwall on 30 June 2020, being replaced in the 83rd-minute. The injury ultimately ruled him out of the remainder of the 2019–20 season and he returned to Watford to undergo rehabilitation on his knee. He made 23 appearances during the loan agreement at Swansea, scoring two goals.

Return to Watford
With Watford having suffered relegation to the Championship the previous season, Wilmot began the 2020–21 season playing regularly. He scored his first goal for Watford in a 1–1 draw with Queens Park Rangers on 21 November 2020. He played 27 times during a season in which Watford would earn promotion back into the Premier League after finishing in second-place in the Championship.

Stoke City
Having played "a pivotal role" in Watford's automatic promotion-winning season, Wilmot attracted transfer interest from a number of clubs. He signed for Championship club Stoke City for an undisclosed fee on 24 June 2021, agreeing a four-year contract. He scored his first goal for the club, a 30-yard strike in a 2–1 home defeat to Preston North End on 3 January 2022. His goal won him the Championship goal of the month for January and was nominated of the EFL Goal of the Season award. Wilmot made 39 appearances during the 2021–22 season as Stoke finished in 14th position.

International career
Wilmot was called up to represent England under-19s in March 2018 for their three 2018 UEFA European under-19 Championship qualification matches in Skopje. Wilmot was the only player outside of the top two divisions to be named in the squad. He made his England under-19 debut in a 3–0 win over Latvia under-19s on 24 March 2018, coming on as an 84th-minute substitute in the match. In doing so, he became the first Stevenage player to represent England at youth level.

Wilmot was included in the England under-21 squad on 30 August 2019. He was called up once again in October 2019 and eventually made his under-21 debut in a 2–2 draw against Slovenia under-21s in Maribor on 11 October 2019, coming on as a second-half substitute in the match. He scored his first goal at under-21 level during a 3–1 victory over Andorra under-21s at Molineux on 13 November 2020.

Style of play
Described as a "ball-playing midfielder" in the youth system at Stevenage, Wilmot moved into central defence where he was deployed during his breakthrough season in the first-team with the club. After signing for Watford, manager Javi Gracia stated that Wilmot "has the intelligence" to play in a holding midfield role in front of the two central defenders. He was subsequently deployed there during the 2018–19 season for both Watford and Udinese. Wilmot considers himself primarily a defender, but states he is also comfortable playing in midfield. He has said he does not model his game on any other player, but "takes inspiration from technically-gifted players" such as Sergio Busquets.

Career statistics

Honours
Individual
EFL League Two Apprentice of the Year: 2017–18

References

External links

1999 births
Living people
People from Stevenage
English footballers
England youth international footballers
Association football defenders
Stevenage F.C. players
Watford F.C. players
Udinese Calcio players
Swansea City A.F.C. players
Stoke City F.C. players
English Football League players
Premier League players
Serie A players
English expatriate footballers
Expatriate footballers in Italy
English expatriate sportspeople in Italy